Gene Sarazen (born Eugenio Saraceni, February 27, 1902 – May 13, 1999) was an American professional golfer, one of the world's top players in the 1920s and 1930s, and the winner of seven major championships. He is one of five players (along with Ben Hogan, Gary Player, Jack Nicklaus, and Tiger Woods) to win each of the four majors at least once, now known as the Career Grand Slam:
U.S. Open (1922, 1932),
PGA Championship (1922, 1923, 1933),
The Open Championship (1932), and
Masters Tournament (1935).

Early life
Eugenio Saraceni was born on February 27, 1902, in Harrison, New York, his parents were poor Sicilian immigrants. He began caddying at age ten at local golf clubs, took up golf himself, and gradually developed his skills; Sarazen was essentially self-taught. Somewhat novel at the time, he used the interlocking grip to hold the club.

Career
Sarazen took a series of club professional jobs in the New York area from his mid-teens. In 1921, he became a professional at Titusville (Pa.) Country Club, and he contracted to be the professional at Highland Country Club near Pittsburgh, Pa. in 1922. Sarazen arrived in April, stocked the golf shop and gave a few lessons, but spent most of his time at Oakmont Country Club practicing with Emil Loeffler. At some point, the pair visited Skokie Country Club to practice on the course that would hold the U.S. Open; in July, he came from four shots behind to win the tournament. He returned to Pittsburgh and was feted at the William Penn Hotel, where he burst from a paper mâché golf ball. He did not return to Highland CC, broke his contract and became a 'touring' golf professional. Later that summer, he won the PGA Championship at Oakmont.

Sarazen was a contemporary and rival of amateur Bobby Jones, who was born in the same year; he also had many battles with Walter Hagen, who was nine years older. Sarazen, Jones, and Hagen were the world's dominant players during the 1920s. Rivalries among the three great champions significantly expanded interest in golf around the world during this period, and made the United States the world's dominant golf power for the first time, taking over this position from Great Britain. Sarazen has a plaque in his honor placed 195 yards out from the 15th green at Hororata Golf Club where he famously made a double eagle in the final round of sectional qualifiers. He earned his spot in his first United States Open in 1920 at age 18. Some say it was his greatest achievement as an amateur.

The winner of 38 PGA tour events, Sarazen was inducted into the World Golf Hall of Fame in 1974. He was the Associated Press Male Athlete of the Year in 1932, and won the PGA Tour's first Lifetime Achievement Award in 1996. He played on six U.S. Ryder Cup teams: 1927, 1929, 1931, 1933, 1935, and 1937.

Invents modern sand wedge
Sarazen claimed to have invented the modern sand wedge, and debuted the club (while keeping it secret during preliminary practice rounds) at The Open Championship at Prince's Golf Club in 1932 (which he won). He called it the sand iron, and his original club is no longer on display at Prince's as it is worth too much for the insurers to cover. However, a similar club was patented in 1928 by Edwin Kerr McClain, and it is possible Sarazen saw this club.

Sarazen had previously struggled with his sand play and there had been earlier sand-specific clubs. But Bobby Jones's sand club, for example, had a concave face, which actually contacted the ball twice during a swing; this design was later banned. Sarazen's innovation was to weld solder onto the lower back of the club, building up the flange so that it sat lower than the leading edge when soled. The flange, not the leading edge, would contact the sand first, and explode sand as the shot was played. The additional weight provided punch to power through the thick sand. Sarazen's newly developed technique with the new club was to contact the sand a couple of inches behind the ball, not actually contacting the ball at all on most sand shots.

Every top-class golfer since has utilized this wedge design and technique, and the same club design and method are also used by amateur players around the world. The sand wedge also began to be used by top players for shots from grass, shortly after Sarazen introduced it, and this led to a revolution in short-game techniques, along with lower scoring by players who mastered the skills.

Masters Tournament win
Sarazen hit "the shot heard 'round the world" at Augusta National Golf Club on the fifteenth hole in the final round of the Masters Tournament in 1935. He struck a spoon (the loft of the modern four wood)  into the hole, scoring a double eagle. At the time he was trailing Craig Wood by three shots, and was then tied with him. He parred the 16th, 17th and 18th holes to preserve the tie. The following day, the pair played a 36-hole playoff, with Sarazen winning by five shots.

It remains one of the most famous golf shots in golf history.

Later years, legacy
He played several lengthy exhibition tours around the world, promoting his skills and the sport of golf, and earned a very good living from golf. One of his American tours in 1940 was sponsored by Golf Magazine and he played a match every day for 60 days. As a multiple past champion, he was eligible to continue competing after his best years were past, and occasionally did so in the top events, well into the 1960s, and occasionally into the 1970s. Throughout his life, Sarazen competed wearing knickers or plus-fours, which were the fashion when he broke into the top level.

For many years after his retirement, Sarazen was a familiar figure as an honorary starter at the Masters. From 1981 to 1999, he joined Byron Nelson and Sam Snead in hitting a ceremonial tee shot before each Masters tournament. He also popularized the sport with his role as a commentator on the Wonderful World of Golf television show, and was an early TV broadcaster at important events.

At age 71, Sarazen made a hole-in-one at The Open Championship in 1973, at the "Postage Stamp" at Troon in Scotland. In 1992, he was voted the Bob Jones Award, the highest honor given by the United States Golf Association in recognition of distinguished sportsmanship in golf. Sarazen had what is still the longest-running endorsement contract in professional sports – with Wilson Sporting Goods from 1923 until his death, a total of 75 years.

Sarazen received an honorary degree in 1978 from Siena College, in Loudonville, New York. In 1998, shortly before his death, the Sarazen Student Union was named in his honor. He also established an endowed scholarship fund at the college, The Gene and Mary Sarazen Scholarship, which is awarded annually to students reflecting the high personal, athletic, and intellectual ideals of Dr. Sarazen. For many years, kitted in his signature plus-fours, he hit the first ball in an annual golf tournament, held to raise funds for the scholarship.

Sarazen died at age 97 in 1999 from complications of pneumonia in Naples, Florida. His wife Mary died thirteen years earlier in 1986, and they are interred at Marco Island Cemetery in Marco.

In 2000, Sarazen was ranked as the 11th greatest golfer of all time by Golf Digest magazine. In 2018, T.J. Auclair ranked Sarazen as the ninth greatest golfer of all time.

Professional wins (48)

PGA Tour wins (38)
1922 (3) Southern (Spring) Open, U.S. Open, PGA Championship
1923 (1) PGA Championship
1925 (1) Metropolitan Open
1926 (1) Miami Open
1927 (3) Long Island Open, Miami Beach Open, Metropolitan PGA
1928 (4) Miami Beach Open, Miami Open, Nassau Bahamas Open, Metropolitan PGA
1929 (2) Miami Open, Miami Beach Open
1930 (8) Miami Open, Agua Caliente Open, Florida West Coast Open, Concord Country Club Open, United States Pro Invitational, Western Open, Lannin Memorial Tournament, Middle Atlantic Open
1931 (3) Florida West Coast Open, La Gorce Open, Lannin Memorial Tournament
1932 (4) True Temper Open, Coral Gables Open, U.S. Open, The Open Championship
1933 (1) PGA Championship
1935 (3) Masters Tournament, Massachusetts Open, Long Island Open
1937 (2) Florida West Coast Open, Chicago Open
1938 (1) Lake Placid Open
1941 (1) Miami Biltmore International Four-Ball (with Ben Hogan)

Major championships are shown in bold.

Source:

Australian Tour win (1)
1936 Australian Open

Other wins (6)
this list may be incomplete
1923 Daily Dispatch Northern Professional Championship
1928 Miami International Four-Ball (with Johnny Farrell)
1939 Metropolitan PGA
1945 Shoreline Open
1948 Shoreline Open
1966 Northeast New York PGA Championship

Senior wins (3)
1954 PGA Seniors' Championship, World Senior Championship
1958 PGA Seniors' Championship

Major championships

Wins (7)

Note: The PGA Championship was match play until 1958 
1 Defeated Craig Wood in a 36-hole playoff - Sarazen 144 (Even), Wood 149 (+5)

Results timeline

NYF = tournament not yet founded
NT = no tournament
WD = withdrew
DNQ = did not qualify for match play portion
CUT = missed the half-way cut
R64, R32, R16, QF, SF = round in which player lost in PGA Championship match play
"T" indicates a tie for a place

Summary

Most consecutive cuts made – 44 (1920 U.S. Open – 1937 U.S. Open)
Longest streak of top-10s – 7 (1927 PGA – 1929 PGA)

See also
Career Grand Slam Champions
List of golfers with most PGA Tour wins
List of men's major championships winning golfers
Most PGA Tour wins in a year
Sarazen World Open

References

External links

Gene Sarazen Profile at Golf Legends
Electronic Resources on Gene Sarazen from SoHG Archives
Gene Sarazen swing sequences from SoHG Master Classes

 
American male golfers
PGA Tour golfers
Ryder Cup competitors for the United States
Winners of men's major golf championships
Men's Career Grand Slam champion golfers
World Golf Hall of Fame inductees
Golf writers and broadcasters
Golfers from New York (state)
American people of Italian descent
People from Harrison, New York
1902 births
1999 deaths